Bacteria are a major group of prokaryotic living organisms.

Bacteria may also refer to:
Bacteria (malware) or Rabbit Programs, a type of malicious software
Bacteria, a fictional country in The Great Dictator
Bacteria (Asterix character), the wife of Unhygienix in the Asterix comics
Bacteriidae, a family of South American stick insects